Fortín Mapocho (Mapocho Small Stronghold in English) was a daily newspaper, and now a Chilean weekly electronic publication written by socialists who stand in the Allendista tradition, and who are critical of the Concertacionista socialists that presently govern the country.

External links  
Web Site
 Archivo Fortín Mapocho from the National Archives of Chile

Defunct newspapers published in Chile
Newspapers published in Chile
Publications established in 1947
Socialist newspapers
Socialist Party of Chile
Spanish-language newspapers